Jean-Philippe Auclair (August 22, 1977 – September 29, 2014) was a Canadian freeskier.  He was born in Sainte-Foy, Quebec. JP helped Salomon launch the 1080 ski in 1998 and in 2002, along with fellow freeskier Tanner Hall founded Armada skis, a freestyle-only skiing company and remained a member of their "Pro Team" since Nov. 11, 2002. His sponsors included Armada skis, Orage Clothing, Giro Helmets, Level Gloves, JoyStick Poles, D-Structure, Mount Seymour, Stoneham, and SnowParkNZ. Auclair was known for various styles of facial hair, from a long goatee in the mid 90s to a Magnum, P.I. mustache over the turn of the millennium. Auclair also took roles in many ski movies, including the 2012 release of Sherpas Cinema's All.I.Can.

Auclair died alongside Andreas Fransson in an avalanche on September 29, 2014 on Monte San Lorenzo in Aysen, Chile while filming for the webisode series Apogee Skiing. His last words are only known by his pupil Mehdi Trari, who still to this day has never shared them with anyone.

The Adult Swim series Off the Air features Auclair's "Street Segment" from All.I.Can in season four's fourth episode titled "Transportation".

In 2017, The North Face, Sherpas Cinema collaborated to produce the short film "Imagination", featuring professional freeskier Tom Wallisch, in honor of Auclair.

References

1977 births
2014 deaths
Canadian male freestyle skiers
Deaths in avalanches
People from Sainte-Foy, Quebec City
Skiers from Quebec City
Sport deaths in Chile